Songs from the Road is a live album by British blues rock artist Joanne Shaw Taylor, covering her first three studio albums. It was released on 12 May 2013 on Ruf Records. Included with the CD is a DVD recorded live at London’s Borderline club.

Track listing
"Soul Station" (Joanne Shaw Taylor) – 5:56
"Tied & Bound" (Joanne Shaw Taylor) – 6:42
"Beautifully Broken" (Joanne Shaw Taylor) – 7:31
"Watch 'Em Burn" (Joanne Shaw Taylor) – 10:31
"Diamonds In The Dirt" (Joanne Shaw Taylor) – 6:51
"Manic Depression" (Jimi Hendrix) – 7:37
"Jealousy" (Frank Miller) – 7:10
"Kiss The Ground Goodbye" (Joanne Shaw Taylor) – 7:26
"Just Another Word" (Joanne Shaw Taylor) – 4:24
"Band Introductions" (Joanne Shaw Taylor) – 0:30
"Jump That Train" (Joanne Shaw Taylor) – 6:37
"Going Home" (Joanne Shaw Taylor) – 5:35

Personnel
Joanne Shaw Taylor – All electric guitars, vocals, and Gordon on tracks 4 and 12.
Tony Dicello – Drums, Vocals (Background).
Julian "Mr. Jools" Grudgings – Keyboards
Joseph Veloz – Guitar (Bass), Vocals (Background).

References

2013 albums
Joanne Shaw Taylor albums